Taj Club House is the fourth hotel of the Taj Group of Hotels in Chennai, India. Formerly known as the Taj Mount Road, it is a five-star luxury hotel located on Clubhouse Road, off Anna Salai, across the Taj Connemara Hotel, another property of the Taj Group. Owned by Taj GVK Hotels & Resorts Limited, an associate of the Taj Group, and built at a cost of  1,600 million, it was opened in December 2008. The hotel was designed by Thom Catallo of Mackenzie Designphase Hospitality.

General information
The hotel is seven stories high with a 45,000 sq ft blue glass facade and has 220 rooms including 16 suites. These include 38 superior rooms, 107 deluxe rooms, 59 premium rooms, nine executive suites (500 sq ft), six deluxe suites (662 sq ft) and a presidential suite (3,500 sq ft). The 3,300-sq ft banqueting hall on the ground floor, The Summit, can hold up to 400 guests. There are two meetings rooms with a maximum capacity of 30 and a boardroom for up to 12 people on the sixth floor.

Restaurants include Club House the all-day dining restaurant that serves European cuisine, Beyond Indus serving cuisine from Punjab, Rawalpindi and Sindh and also with wines, Kefi serving Mediterranean cuisine, Blend bar, Brew coffee and tea shop and Deli serving delicacies ranging from sandwiches to exotic chocolates. The rooftop facilities include a lap pool, a gymnasium and a yoga room.

See also

 Hotels in Chennai

References

Further reading

External links
 Official website 

Hotels in Chennai
Taj Hotels Resorts and Palaces
2008 establishments in Tamil Nadu
Hotels established in 2008